St. Peter's Fiesta is a five-day festival honoring the patron saint of the fisherman, St. Peter. Hosted by the Italian American community of Gloucester, Massachusetts, the festival involves a carnival, seine boat races, and the Greasy Pole contest, and attracts people from all over.

History
The festival began in 1927 when a life-sized statue of St. Peter was enshrined by fishermen in the heart of Gloucester's Italian district. The fishermen and their families began to pray to their patron saint, and soon plans of a religious procession on June 29 came about. They grew to the festival it is today.

No festival was held from 1942–45, nor in 2020–21.

Greasy Pole contest
The Greasy Pole is a three-day competition where men attempt to cross a 40-foot wooden piling that is extended horizontally 30 feet above the cold water of the harbor. The pole is covered in bacon fat, Crisco, fish guts, and lard from local restaurants, and each contestant must try to retrieve the red flag attached at the end. The winner is carried through the streets of Gloucester and can drink for free at each public house stop along the route.

Concept

The Greasy Pole competition originated in Sicily in the 19th century or earlier, and was brought to Gloucester by the Italian immigrant population of fishermen in the early 20th century. This pole is then heavily greased with biodegradable axle grease mixed with anything from Tabasco sauce to oil, banana peels, and various other slippery objects. A red flag (or sometimes the Italian Flag with a red flag underneath it) is then nailed to the very end of the pole. The idea is to run out on the heavily greased pole and try to grab the flag before slipping and falling into the water. About 40 or 50 men between age 18–60 go out from Pavilion Beach in Gloucester MA during the St. Peter Fiesta, the last weekend of June. They walk the pole one at a time in a pre-determined order. Generally, the men are of Italian descent, although the walkers may include all nationalities. Because of the popularity of the event, there are strict rules as to who is eligible to walk on Sunday. The event is currently held on Friday, Saturday and Sunday at 4:45p.m.

Rules

The first round of the Greasy Pole is dubbed as the "Courtesy Round." This is done so that all the walkers get a chance to walk the pole. Generally, this is used to get a feel for exactly how greasy the pole really is. Some of the more experienced walkers only walk out a small distance and then dive off the pole into the water to save themselves from injury. Once all the walkers participating have walked, the second round begins. After the courtesy round is over, the flag can come down at any time.
There are three days in which the Greasy Pole is competed:

Fiesta Friday
Most of the newcomers to the Greasy Pole event walk on Friday. The winner of the Friday Greasy Pole will walk first on Saturday.

Fiesta Saturday
People who began walking before Greasy Pole Friday was implemented in 1999 or people who have won on Greasy Pole Friday walk on Saturday. The winner of Saturday then will walk first on Sunday.

Fiesta Sunday
Also referred to as Championship Sunday. The winner of Saturday walks first, and on the platform are the former Saturday and Sunday champions of the Greasy Pole from years past and protégés of the former champions who can no longer walk because they have died or can no longer walk for health reasons. Winning on Fiesta Sunday is the most prestigious honor that a Greasy Pole walker can achieve, and every year they return to walk on Fiesta Sunday.

Awards

Generally speaking, the Greasy Pole is done for bragging rights. A trophy is given out to the winner, but in the close knit town of Gloucester where everyone knows each other, this is done for the right to say "I won." (free drinks all night at all the bars)

Dangers

This is obviously a very risky event. Several injuries, most of them minor, can and have occurred. These injuries can range from scrapes and bruises to broken facial bones or ribs from falling and landing on the pole. Police boats are nearby to assist if someone is seriously injured and needs to be taken to the hospital.

Trivia

 The first winner of the Greasy Pole was Natale Misuraca. He died in 2011, and the new pole structure has a shrine to him at the point of departure for all walkers.
 The record for most Greasy Pole wins belongs to Salvi Benson (10): 4 Saturdays, 6 Sundays.
 Peter "Black" Frontiero won 7 straight Sunday contests between 1987–1993. Most Sunday wins, 9 over all and all on Super Sunday.
 Only 2 men have won all 3 days (Friday, Saturday, and Sunday). Jake Wood was the first in 1999 (6th round Friday, 3rd Sat, 2nd Sun). Jake started walking in 1998 he now has a total of 7 wins . The Friday Greasy Pole was implemented, 1999. In 2019 Derek Hopkins became the second man to win all 3 days taking the flag down in the 2nd round all 3 days in his first year of eligibility, 20 years after Jake Wood accomplished the first trifecta.
 Anthony "Matza" Giambanco is known as the "Sheriff of the Greasy Pole." 6 time champ. "Matza" famously walked and slid to the end of the pole, where he stood for a few seconds in triumph before jumping into the water with flag in hand.
 In 1979, one man grabbed the flag in the first round, breaking the Courtesy Round rule. Unfortunately, he incurred the wrath of Anthony "Matza" Giambanco. He promptly punched the man, nailed the flag to the pole, and the competition continued.
 Peter "Black" Frontiero is the only walker in the history of the competition to win in three different decades (1980s, 1990s and 2000s) and with three different announcers (Mike Deliberti, Big Tom Brancleone, and Sammy "Samutzu" Nicastro.
 Joseph "JoeyD" DaSilva is the first walker to ever win on sea and land ("the surf and turf champion") with his two wins (Friday Fiesta 2011 and Fall Classic Saturday 2011).
 For the 75th anniversary, in a big surprise to everyone, the announcer at the time (Sam Nicastro) was joined by his predecessors Big Tom Brancleone and Mike Dileberti for the announcing duties.
 Joseph "JoeyD" DaSilva holds the Guinness World Record for the fastest time to cross a  pole at 4.96 seconds. He set the record on the set of "Guinness World Records Gone Wild" in Los Angeles, California July 6, 2012.
 The Greasy Pole was washed away, along with the platform that supported it, by a storm on September 30, 2011. As of March, 2012, it was being rebuilt and was expected to be ready for the 2012 event.

Past Winners
1931 to 1998 (Before Friday Competition):

1999 to Current (Friday Competition Introduced)

The 2011 Greasy Pole Fall Classic 
To help raise some of the money needed to replace the greasy pole platform that was damaged by tropical storm Irene, the Saint Peter's Fiesta Committee hosted the 2011 Greasy Pole Fall Classic at Gloucester High School's Newell Stadium. The competition featured three greasy poles, designated bronze, silver, and gold. This is expected to be the only Fall Classic, as the Greasy Pole is to be replaced with a platform that will last a century. The two time champ Joe DaSilva is the first person to ever win on sea and land, which earned him the nickname "Surf and Turf Champion." In 2012 Nick Avelis won Saturday's pole, and in 2013 Kyle Barry won Friday's pole, making all three "turf" champions "surf"  champions as well (Avelis also won 2013 Sunday).

In film 

In 2009, CoffeeBlack Productions — the Gloucester filmmaking team of Emile Doucette, Thomas Papows, and Michael Pallazola – created a short 7-minute documentary about the Greasy Pole and its cultural significance in the small fishing community of Gloucester, Massachusetts. The film won the Documentary Educational Resources Award at the International Documentary Challenge at the Hot Docs Canadian International Documentary Film Festival. The group has plans to make a feature-length version of the film due out in 2010.

References

Gloucester, Massachusetts
Festivals in Massachusetts
Tourist attractions in Essex County, Massachusetts